Konrad Handzlik (born 13 February 1998) is a Polish professional footballer who plays as a midfielder for Garbarnia Kraków.

Career

At the age of 17, Handzlik debuted for Wisła Kraków in the Polish top flight.

In 2016, he signed for the reserves of Legia Warsaw.

In 2020, he signed for Polish top flight side Warta Poznań from Olimpia Grudziądz in the second division.

References

External links
 
 Konrad Handzlik at 90minut

Living people
1998 births
People from Wadowice
Polish footballers
Poland youth international footballers
Association football midfielders
Wisła Kraków players
Legia Warsaw II players
Zagłębie Sosnowiec players
Olimpia Grudziądz players
Warta Poznań players
GKS Jastrzębie players
Garbarnia Kraków players
Ekstraklasa players
I liga players
II liga players
III liga players